Xavier Coll is a Spanish classical guitarist. In the year 1989, he formed the  classical, flute-guitar duo with Montserrat Gascón. He also played in a group with Pedro Javier González, Yoshimi Otani and Alex Garrobé. He has most recently performed with the Barcelona Guitar Trio, along with Luis Robisco and Manuel Gonzalez.

References

Spanish classical guitarists
Spanish male guitarists
Living people
Year of birth missing (living people)